Juan Carlos Riolfo Seco (November 5, 1905 – December 5, 1978) was a Uruguayan footballer who played for the Uruguay national team. He played only 2 matches for national team, both in 1928 against Argentina, but was an unused member of the team which won the first ever World Cup in 1930. He played for Peñarol in club football.

References

World Cup Champions Squads 1930 - 2002
O nascimento da mítica Celeste Olímpica 

1905 births
Uruguayan footballers
Uruguay international footballers
Uruguayan people of Italian descent
1930 FIFA World Cup players
FIFA World Cup-winning players
Uruguayan Primera División players
Peñarol players
Estudiantes de La Plata footballers
Uruguayan expatriate footballers
Expatriate footballers in Argentina
1978 deaths
Association football midfielders